The Dionysia (Greek: Διονύσια) was a large festival in ancient Athens in honor of the god Dionysus, the central events of which were the theatrical performances of dramatic tragedies and, from 487 BC, comedies. It was the second-most important festival after the Panathenaia. The Dionysia actually consisted of two related festivals, the Rural Dionysia and the City Dionysia, which took place in different parts of the year. They were also an essential part of the Dionysian Mysteries.

Rural Dionysia
The Dionysia was originally a rural festival in Eleutherae, Attica ( – Dionysia ta kat' agrous), probably celebrating the cultivation of vines. It was probably a very ancient festival, perhaps not originally associated with Dionysus. This "rural Dionysia" was held during the winter, in the month of Poseideon (the month straddling the winter solstice, i.e., Dec.-Jan.). The central event was the pompe (πομπή), the procession, in which phalloi (φαλλοί) were carried by phallophoroi (φαλλοφόροι). Also participating in the pompe were kanephoroi (κανηφόροι – young girls carrying baskets), obeliaphoroi (ὀβελιαφόροι
– who carried long loaves of bread), skaphephoroi (σκαφηφόροι – who carried other offerings), hydriaphoroi (ὑδριαφόροι – who carried jars of water), and askophoroi (ἀσκοφόροι – who carried jars of wine).

After the pompe procession was completed, there were contests of dancing and singing, and choruses (led by a choregos) would perform dithyrambs. Some festivals may have included dramatic performances, possibly of the tragedies and comedies that had been produced at the City Dionysia the previous year. This was more common in the larger towns, such as Piraeus and Eleusis.

Because the various towns in Attica held their festivals on different days, it was possible for spectators to visit more than one festival per season. It was also an opportunity for Athenian citizens to travel outside the city if they did not have the opportunity to do so during the rest of the year. This also allowed travelling companies of actors to perform in more than one town during the period of the festival.

The comic playwright Aristophanes parodied the Rural Dionysia in his play The Acharnians.

City Dionysia

Origins
The City Dionysia (Dionysia ta en Astei – Διονύσια τὰ ἐν Ἄστει, also known as the Great Dionysia, Dionysia ta Megala – Διονύσια τὰ Μεγάλα) was the urban part of the festival, possibly established during the tyranny of Peisistratus in the 6th century BC. This festival was held probably from the 10th to the 16th of the month Elaphebolion (the lunar month straddling the vernal equinox, i.e., Mar.-Apr in the solar calendar), three months after the rural Dionysia, probably to celebrate the end of winter and the harvesting of the year's crops. According to tradition, the festival was established after Eleutherae, a town on the border between Attica and Boeotia, had chosen to become part of Attica. The Eleuthereans brought a statue of Dionysus to Athens, which was initially rejected by the Athenians. Dionysus then punished the Athenians with a plague affecting the male genitalia, which was cured when the Athenians accepted the cult of Dionysus. This was recalled each year by a procession of citizens carrying phalloi.

The urban festival was a relatively recent invention. This ceremony fell under the auspices of the Archons of Athens, rather than the basileus, to whom religious festivals were given when the office of archon was created in the 7th century BC.

Pompe and Proagon
The archon prepared for the City Dionysia as soon as he was elected, by choosing his two páredroi (πάρεδροι, "reeves", literally: "by the chair") and ten epimelētai (ἐπιμεληταί, "curators") to help organize the festival. On the first day of the festival, the pompē ("pomp", "procession") was held, in which citizens, metics, and representatives from Athenian colonies marched to the Theatre of Dionysus on the southern slope of the Acropolis, carrying the wooden statue of Dionysus Eleuthereus, the "leading" or eisagōgē (εἰσαγωγή, "introduction"). As with the Rural Dionysia, they also carried phalloi, made of wood or bronze, aloft on poles, and a cart pulled a much larger phallus. Basket-carriers and water and wine-carriers participated in the pompe here, as in the Rural Dionysia.

During the height of the Athenian Empire in the mid-5th century BC, various gifts and weapons showcasing Athens' strength were carried as well. Also included in the procession were bulls to be sacrificed in the theatre. The most conspicuous members of the procession were the chorēgoí (χορηγοί, "sponsors", literally: "chorus leaders"), who were dressed in the most expensive and ornate clothing. After the pompē, the chorēgoí led their choruses in the dithyrambic competitions. These were extremely competitive, and the best flute players and celebrity poets (such as Simonides and Pindar) offered their musical and lyrical services. After these competitions, the bulls were sacrificed, and a feast was held for all the citizens of Athens. A second procession, the kōmos (κῶμος), occurred afterwards, which was most likely a drunken revelry through the streets.

The next day, the playwrights announced the titles of the plays to be performed, and judges were selected by lot: the "proagōn" (προαγών, "pre-contest"). It is unknown where the proagōn originally took place, but after the mid-5th century BC, it was held in the Odeon of Pericles on the foot of Acropolis. The proagōn was also used to give praise to notable citizens, or often foreigners, who had served Athens in some beneficial way during the year. During the Peloponnesian War, orphaned children of those who had been killed in battle were also paraded in the Odeon, possibly to honour their fathers. The proagōn could be used for other announcements as well; in 406 BC the death of the playwright Euripides was announced there.

Dramatic performances
Following the pompe, the Theatre of Dionysus was purified by the sacrifice of a bull. According to tradition, the first performance of tragedy at the Dionysia was by the playwright and actor Thespis (from whom we take the word "thespian") in 534 BC. His award was reportedly a goat, a common symbol for Dionysus, and this "prize" possibly suggests the origin of the word "tragedy" (which means "goat-song").

During the fifth century BC, five days of the festival were set aside for performance, though scholars disagree exactly what was presented each day.  At least three full days were devoted to tragic plays, and each of three playwrights presented his set of three tragedies and one satyr play on the successive days.  Most of the extant Greek tragedies, including those of Aeschylus, Euripides, and Sophocles, were performed at the Theatre of Dionysus. The archons, epimeletai, and judges (agonothetai – ἀγωνοθἐται) watched from the front row.

The other two days of the festival were likely devoted to dithyrambic contests until 487/6 BC, when comic poets were officially admitted to the agons and eligible for their own prizes. Each of five comic writers presented a single play (except during the Peloponnesian War, when only three plays were performed), though it is unknown whether they were performed continuously on one day, or over the course of the five-day festival. Until 449 BC, only dramatic works were awarded prizes in the agon, but after that time, actors also became eligible for recognition.  It was considered a great honour to win the comedic prize at the City Dionysia, despite the belief that comedies were of secondary importance. The Lenaia festival, held earlier in the year, featured comedy more prominently and officially recognized comic performances with prizes in 442 BC.

Impressive tragic output continued without pause through the first three quarters of the fourth century BC, and some scholars consider this time a continuation of the classical period. Though much of the work of this period is either lost or forgotten, it is considered to owe a great debt to the playwright Euripides. His plays, along with other fifth-century BC writers, were often re-staged during this period. At least one revival was presented each year at City Dionysia. It has been suggested that audiences may have preferred to see well-known plays re-staged, rather than financially support new plays of questionable quality; or alternately, that revivals represented a nostalgia for the glory of Athens from before the devastation of the Peloponnesian War. Nevertheless, plays continued to be written and performed until the 2nd century BC, when new works of both comedy and tragedy seem to have been eliminated.  After that point drama continued to be produced, but prizes were awarded to wealthy producers and famous actors rather than the long-dead playwrights whose work was being performed.

Another procession and celebration was held on the final day, when the judges chose the winners of the tragedy and comedy performances. The winning playwrights were awarded a wreath of ivy.

Known winners of the City Dionysia

Tragedy 
(? = exact year not preserved)

Pre 484 - Choerilus, Phrynichus, Pratinus
484 BC – Aeschylus
4?? BC - Euetes
472 BC – Aeschylus (The Persians)
471 BC – Polyphrasmon
4?? BC - Nothippus
468 BC – Sophocles (Triptolemus)
467 BC – Aeschylus (Seven Against Thebes); Aristias took 2nd place
4?? BC - Mesatus
463 BC – Aeschylus (The Suppliants)
460 BC - Aristias
458 BC – Aeschylus (The Oresteia); Sophocles took 2nd place
449 BC – Herakleides
447 BC – Sophocles (Antigone) (year approximate)
441 BC – Euripides
438 BC - Sophocles; Euripides took 2nd place with [Alcestis]
431 BC – Euphorion, son of Aeschylus; Sophocles took 2nd place; Euripides took 3rd with Medea
428 BC – Euripides (Hippolytus)
427 BC – Philocles, nephew of Aeschylus; Sophocles took 2nd place with Oedipus Rex
416 BC – Agathon
415 BC – Xenocles
409 BC – Sophocles (Philoctetes)
405 BC – Euripides (The Bacchae, Iphigenia in Aulis, Alcmaeon in Corinth)
401 BC - Sophocles (Oedipus at Colonus (posthumous award)
372 BC – Astydamas
3?? BC - Aphareus

Comedy 
(? = exact year not preserved)

486 BC – Chionides
472 BC – Magnes
458 BC – Euphonius
450 BC – Crates
446 BC – Callias
43? BC - Cratinus
437 BC – Pherecrates
435 BC – Hermippus
427 BC - Unknown; Aristophanes took 2nd place with The Banqueters
426 BC - Aristophanes (The Babylonians)
423 BC – Cratinus (The Wicker Flask)
422 BC – Cantharus
421 BC – Eupolis of Athens took 1st place with his play Kolakes (Flatteres); Aristophanes took 2nd place with Peace
414 BC – Ameipsias (The Revellers), Aristophanes "The Birds" (Όρνιθες), Phrynichos "Solitary" (Μονότροπος)
410 BC – Plato the Comic (Πλάτων Κωμικός)
402 BC – Cephisodoros
290 BC – Poseidippus
278 BC – Philemon
185 BC – Laines
183 BC – Philemon
154 BC – Chairion

Modern adaptations
The festival has inspired people through the present day, as a celebration of humanity (see Nietzsche's or Aristotle's take) and an exposition of culture. The University of Houston's Center for Creative works produces and performs an adaptation each spring. The purpose of the enterprise is to educate and entertain, and adaptations occasionally go beyond Greek theater for inspiration (for example, the 2013 Spring adaptation of the Iliad, titled Ilium). Collaborators flock from all over America and the productions themselves are quite popular, selling out on all ticketed venues.

The New York Classical Club, through Fordham University's Classics Department, stages a competition every April wherein groups of high school students produce unique adaptations of the same play. The competition aims to engage the themes and style of the ancient plays with renewed vigor and an accessible, thought provoking frame. Several notable schools from the area participate, including Stuyvesant and Regis. Adaptations are cut to twenty minutes, and source plays have included The Bacchae by Euripides and the entire collection of Ovid's Metamorphoses.

Educational charity The Iris Project holds a Dionysia Festival every year with Year Eight students from Cheney School, who adapt and modernise Aristophanes plays. The festival is usually hosted at Corpus Christi College, Oxford.

Modern followers of Hellenism celebrate Dionysia as a holiday and use a version of the Attic calendar to calculate it.

See also
 Athenian festivals
Anthesteria
Bacchanalia
Ganachakra
Lenaia
Panathenaia

Notes

Sources
Aristophanes, The Acharnians.
Simon Goldhill, "The Great Dionysia and Civic Ideology", in Nothing to Do with Dionysos? Athenian Drama in Its Social Context, eds. John J. Winkler and Froma I. Zeitlin. Princeton: Princeton University Press, 1990. 
Susan Guettel Cole, "Procession and Celebration at the Dionysia", in Theater and Society in the Classical World, ed. Ruth Scodel. Ann Arbor: University of Michigan Press, 1993. 
Jeffrey M. Hurwit. The Athenian Acropolis: History, Mythology, and Archaeology From the Neolithic Era to the Present. Cambridge: Cambridge University Press, 1999. 
 Mikalson, Jon D. (1975), The Sacred and Civil Calendar of the Athenian Year, Princeton University Press. .
Sir Arthur Pickard-Cambridge. The Dramatic Festivals of Athens. Oxford: Clarendon Press, 1953 (2nd ed. 1968). 
Robert Parker. Athenian religion: A History. Oxford: Oxford University Press, 1996. 
Carl A. P. Ruck. IG II 2323: The List of the Victors in Comedies at the Dionysia. Leiden: E.J. Brill, 1967.

Further reading
 

Ancient Greek theatre
Greek festivals of Dionysus
Festivals in ancient Athens
December observances